Theory of Reggaetivity is the third studio album from the Dancehall Artist Assassin a.k.a. Agent Sasco. The album features guest appearances from Chronixx and Elesia, Limura. The artist toured  Europe and the United States in support of the album prior to its release.

The album follows Assassin's collaborations in the hip-hop scene with Kanye West and Grammy Award  Winner Kendrick Lamar.

The album features reggae music filled with classic one-drop grooves and melodies.

By its second week of release, Theory of Reggaetivity had reached number 3 on the Billboard Chart and number 2 on the iTunes Reggae Chart.

Track listing
"Theory of Reggaetivity" – 2:20
"What is Reggae (feat. AC, LC & JC)" – 0:09
"Reggae Origin" – 4:01
"Health and Wealth (Kingston Mix)" – 3:44
"Lc Intro(feat. LC)" – 0:09
"Feel Highrie" – 3:57
"Mix Up" – 2:39
"Crazy (feat. Elesia Limura)" – 2:35
"Africa" – 3:34
"J-O-B (Skit)" – 0:49
"No Slave (feat. Chronixx)" – 5:16
"Stronger" – 3:47
"Day in Day Out" – 3:08
"Country Bus" – 3:26

References

 Find Reggae top list here

2016 albums
Concept albums